Dongallo Dora is a 1957 Indian Telugu-language action film, produced by D. L. Narayana under the Chandamama Films banner and directed by P. Chengayya. It stars Akkineni Nageswara Rao and Jamuna, with music composed by M. Subrahmanyam Raju. The film was dubbed into Tamil as Pakka Thirudan.

Plot
Inspector Ram Murthy and Balaji are neighbors and good friends. Both the families live together, Ram Murthy has a son Anand and Balaji has daughter Indira / Indu. The elders want to perform their marriage when they grow and even children are closely acquainted with each other. Meanwhile, Balaji wins 3 lakhs of the lottery and becomes rich, from there onward Balaji's shrew wife Durgamma looks down everyone. This hurts Anand, so, he decides to earn money at any cost hence he becomes a poker. Once in the game a person cheats him, angered Anand takes his father's pistol and shoots him. Anand is arrested and court sends him to Juvenile home. Years roll by, at Juvenile home Anand reforms as a good human being under the guidance of Tataji and returns home. On the way, a gangster Gangaram steals a necklace and keeps it in Anand's pocket. Police catch Anand but he somehow escapes, reaches home where he meets his family members and continues his love story with Indu. After some time, CID Das visits Ram Murthy's house where he recognizes Anand and takes him into custody. Again he escapes, hides in a car owned by Kamini proprietor of Hotel Paradise and also the leader of robbers gang. Kamini blackmails and threatens Anand and makes him as a huge burglar. Meanwhile, Kamini starts loving Anand which hurts Gangaram, so, he informs the police when Anand is jailed and everyone discovers his real shade. Desperate, Balaji makes marriage arrangements of Indu. Knowing this Anand breaks out jail, kidnaps Indu and reaches Kamini's den. Police surround the building and Anand faces Indu at gunpoint. Now Ram Murthy himself moves to perform his duty and father and son encounters each other. In the crossfire, when Ram Murthy is about to shoot Anand Kamini comes in between and before dying she gives her death statement that Anand is innocent. At last, Anand surrenders himself to Police and he is released with a short-term penalty. Finally, the movie ends on a happy note with the marriage of Anand and Indu.

Cast
Akkineni Nageswara Rao as Anand
Jamuna as Indira / Indu 
Relangi as Balaji
Rajanala as Dasu 
R. Nageswara Rao as Gangaram
Gummadi as Inspector Ram Murthy  
Mukkamala as CID Das
K. V. S. Sharma as Tataji
Balakrishna as Sivam
Suryakantham as Durgamma 
G. Varalakshmi as Kamini
E. V. Saroja as Dancer 
Helen as Dancer

Crew
Art: D. S. Godgaonkar, K. Achyuta Rao
Choreography: Pasumarthi 
Fights: R. Nageswara Rao
Dialogues: Acharya Aatreya
Lyrics: Samudrala Sr, Samudrala Jr., Malladi, Narapa Reddy
Playback: Ghantasala, P. Leela, Pithapuram, Swarnalatha, K. Rani
Music: M. Subrahmanyam Raju
Editing:  P. V. Narayana
Cinematography: K. S. Prasad
Producer: D. L. Narayana
Story - Screenplay - Director: P. Chengayya
Banner: Chandamama Films 
Release Date: 19 July 1957

Soundtrack

Telugu Songs
Music composed by M. Subrahmanyam Raju. Music released on H.M.V. Audio Company.

Tamil Songs
Music for songs was composed by T. M. Ibrahim and the lyrics were penned by Ku. Ma. Balasubramaniam, Kuyilan, Mugavai Rajamanikkam & Ku. Sa. Krishnamoorthy. Playback singers are Sirkazhi Govindarajan, A. M. Rajah, S. V. Ponnusamy, P. Leela, Jikki, Swarnalatha & Udutha Sarojini.

References

External links 
 

Indian action films
1950s Tamil-language films
1950s Telugu-language films
1950s action films
Films scored by M. Subramanyam Raju
Films scored by T. M. Ibrahim